Kim Gyeong-ae or Kim Kyŏng-ae, also spelled Kim Kyung-ae or Kim Kyeong-ae, may refer to:

Gim Gyeong-ae (javelin thrower) (born 1988), South Korean javelin thrower
Kim Kyeong-ae (sport shooter) (born 1989), South Korean sport shooter
Kim Kyeong-ae (curler) (born 1994), South Korean curler
Kim Gyeong-ae (field hockey) (born 1970), South Korean hockey player

See also
Kim Kyung-ah (born 1977), South Korean table tennis player